Crassula clavata, is a species of succulent plant in the genus Crassula found in Cape Province, South Africa.

Description
Crassula clavata grows up to 10 inches tall. It has tightly packed oblanceolate leaves, able to grow to 1 inch. They are a dark reddish-purple. The flowers can reach 6 inches and are colored white.

Cultivation
The plant survives in USDA hardiness zone 9b to 11b. Like many other species in the genus, Crassula clavata is easily suspectable to bug and fungal diseases. Propagation can be done through offsets or leaf cuttings.  It needs full sun to partial shade.

References

Flora of South Africa
clavata
Taxa named by N. E. Brown